H.F. Miller & Son Tin Box and Can Manufacturing Plant, or the American Can Company, Miller Factory, and now Miller Court is a historic can manufacturing plant located at Baltimore, Maryland, United States. It was erected in three stages between 1890 and about 1910.  It is a four-story brick manufacturing plant.  The exterior features decorative brickwork, multiple window forms, and substantial construction typical of the period. The interior features chamfered posts, closely spaced joists, and fire doors.

The building has been redeveloped as Miller's Court with 40 apartments, as well as office and project space for public and charitable agencies. Apartments in the $20 million project were marketed to Baltimore public school teachers. The first tenants moved in during July 2009.

H.F. Miller & Son Tin Box and Can Manufacturing Plant was listed on the National Register of Historic Places in 2003.

References

External links
 , including photo from 2002, at Maryland Historical Trust
 Miller's Court – Explore Baltimore Heritage
 Millers Court web site

Buildings and structures in Baltimore
Charles Village, Baltimore
Industrial buildings and structures on the National Register of Historic Places in Baltimore
1890s architecture in the United States
Industrial buildings completed in 1890
1890 establishments in Maryland
American Can Company